James Edmundson Cannon (August 11, 1873 – August 3, 1942) was an American Democratic politician who represented the City of Richmond in the Virginia Senate.

He resigned following the 1923 special session of the General Assembly to accept appointment as the city attorney for Richmond, a position he held until 1938.

References

External links

1873 births
1942 deaths
Democratic Party Virginia state senators
Politicians from Richmond, Virginia
Virginia city attorneys
20th-century American lawyers
20th-century American politicians
University of Virginia School of Law alumni
Lawyers from Richmond, Virginia